Hypercalcemia, also spelled hypercalcaemia, is a high calcium (Ca2+) level in the blood serum. The normal range is 2.1–2.6 mmol/L (8.8–10.7 mg/dL, 4.3–5.2 mEq/L), with levels greater than 2.6 mmol/L defined as hypercalcemia. Those with a mild increase that has developed slowly typically have no symptoms. In those with greater levels or rapid onset, symptoms may include abdominal pain, bone pain, confusion, depression, weakness, kidney stones or an abnormal heart rhythm including cardiac arrest.

Most outpatient cases are due to primary hyperparathyroidism and inpatient cases due to cancer. Other causes of hypercalcemia include sarcoidosis, tuberculosis, Paget disease, multiple endocrine neoplasia (MEN), vitamin D toxicity, familial hypocalciuric hypercalcaemia and certain medications such as lithium and hydrochlorothiazide. Diagnosis should generally include either a corrected calcium or ionized calcium level and be confirmed after a week. Specific changes, such as a shortened QT interval and prolonged PR interval, may be seen on an electrocardiogram (ECG).

Treatment may include intravenous fluids, furosemide, calcitonin, intravenous bisphosphonate, in addition to treating the underlying cause. The evidence for furosemide use, however, is poor. In those with very high levels, hospitalization may be required. Haemodialysis may be used in those who do not respond to other treatments. In those with vitamin D toxicity, steroids may be useful. Hypercalcemia is relatively common. Primary hyperparathyroidism occurs in 1–7 per 1,000 people, and hypercalcaemia occurs in about 2.7% of those with cancer.

Signs and symptoms

The neuromuscular symptoms of hypercalcaemia are caused by a negative bathmotropic effect due to the increased interaction of calcium with sodium channels. Since calcium blocks sodium channels and inhibits depolarization of nerve and muscle fibers, increased calcium raises the threshold for depolarization. This results in diminished deep tendon reflexes (hyporeflexia), and skeletal muscle weakness.

Other symptoms include cardiac arrhythmias (especially in those taking digoxin), fatigue, nausea, vomiting (emesis), loss of appetite, abdominal pain, & paralytic ileus. If kidney impairment occurs as a result, manifestations can include increased urination, urination at night, and increased thirst. Psychiatric manifestation can include emotional instability, confusion, delirium, psychosis, and stupor. Calcium deposits known as limbus sign may be visible in the eyes.

Symptoms are more common at high calcium blood values (12.0 mg/dL or 3 mmol/L). Severe hypercalcaemia (above 15–16 mg/dL or 3.75–4 mmol/L) is considered a medical emergency: at these levels, coma and cardiac arrest can result. The high levels of calcium ions decrease the neuron membrane permeability to sodium ions, thus decreasing excitability, which leads to hypotonicity of smooth and striated muscle. This explains the fatigue, muscle weakness, low tone and sluggish reflexes in muscle groups. The sluggish nerves also explain drowsiness, confusion, hallucinations, stupor or coma. In the gut this causes constipation. Hypocalcaemia causes the opposite by the same mechanism.

Hypercalcaemic crisis 
A hypercalcaemic crisis is an emergency situation with a severe hypercalcaemia, generally above approximately 14 mg/dL (or 3.5 mmol/L).

The main symptoms of a hypercalcaemic crisis are oliguria or anuria, as well as somnolence or coma. After recognition, primary hyperparathyroidism should be proved or excluded.

In extreme cases of primary hyperparathyroidism, removal of the parathyroid gland after surgical neck exploration is the only way to avoid death. The diagnostic program should be performed within hours, in parallel with measures to lower serum calcium. Treatment of choice for acutely lowering calcium is extensive hydration and calcitonin, as well as bisphosphonates (which have effect on calcium levels after one or two days).

Causes
Primary hyperparathyroidism and malignancy account for about 90% of cases of hypercalcaemia.

Causes of hypercalcemia can be divided into those that are PTH dependent or PTH independent.

Parathyroid function
 Primary hyperparathyroidism
 Solitary parathyroid adenoma
 Primary parathyroid hyperplasia
 Parathyroid carcinoma
 Multiple endocrine neoplasia (MEN1 & MEN2A)
 Familial isolated hyperparathyroidism
 Lithium use
 Familial hypocalciuric hypercalcemia/familial benign hypercalcemia

Cancer

 Solid tumour with metastasis (e.g. breast cancer or classically squamous cell carcinoma, which can be PTHrP-mediated)
 Solid tumour with humoral mediation of hypercalcaemia (e.g. lung cancer, most commonly non-small cell lung cancer or kidney cancer, phaeochromocytoma)
 Haematologic cancers (multiple myeloma, lymphoma, leukaemia)
 Ovarian small cell carcinoma of the hypercalcemic type

Vitamin-D disorders
 Hypervitaminosis D (vitamin D intoxication)
 Elevated 1,25(OH)2D (see calcitriol under Vitamin D) levels (e.g. sarcoidosis and other granulomatous diseases such as tuberculosis, berylliosis, histoplasmosis, Crohn's disease, and granulomatosis with polyangiitis)
 Idiopathic hypercalcaemia of infancy
 Rebound hypercalcaemia after rhabdomyolysis

High bone-turnover
 Hyperthyroidism
 Multiple myeloma
 Prolonged immobilization
 Paget's disease
 Thiazide use
 Vitamin A intoxication

Kidney failure
 Tertiary hyperparathyroidism
 Aluminium intoxication
 Milk-alkali syndrome

Other
 Acromegaly
 Adrenal insufficiency
 Zollinger–Ellison syndrome
 Williams Syndrome

Diagnosis
Diagnosis should generally include either a calculation of corrected calcium or direct measurement of ionized calcium level and be confirmed after a week. This is because either high or low serum albumin levels does not show the true levels of ionised calcium. There is, however, controversy around the usefulness of corrected calcium as it may be no better than total calcium.

Once calcium is confirmed to be elevated, a detailed history taken from the subject, including review of medications, any vitamin supplementations, herbal preparations, and previous calcium values. Chronic elevation of calcium with absent or mild symptoms often points to primary hyperparathyroidism or Familial hypocalciuric hypercalcemia. For those who has underlying malignancy, the cancers may be sufficiently severe to show up in history and examination to point towards the diagnosis with little laboratory investigations.

If detailed history and examination does not narrow down the differential diagnoses, further laboratory investigations are performed. Intact PTH (iPTH, biologically active parathyroid hormone molecules) is measured with immunoradiometric or immunochemoluminescent assay. Elevated (or high-normal) iPTH with high urine calcium/creatinine ratio (more than 0.03) is suggestive of primary hyperparathyroidism, usually accompanied by low serum phosphate. High iPTH with low urine calcium/creatinine ratio is suggestive of familial hypocalciuric hypercalcemia. Low iPTH should be followed up with Parathyroid hormone-related protein (PTHrP) measurements (though not available in all labs). Elevated PTHrP is suggestive of malignancy. Normal PTHrP is suggestive of multiple myeloma, vitamin A excess, milk-alkali syndrome, thyrotoxicosis, and immobilisation. Elevated Calcitriol is suggestive of lymphoma, sarcoidosis, granulomatous disorders, and excessive calcitriol intake. Elevated calcifediol is suggestive of vitamin D or excessive calcifediol intake.

The normal range is 2.1–2.6 mmol/L (8.8–10.7 mg/dL, 4.3–5.2 mEq/L), with levels greater than 2.6 mmol/L defined as hypercalcaemia. Moderate hypercalcaemia is a level of 2.88–3.5 mmol/L (11.5–14 mg/dL) while severe hypercalcaemia is > 3.5 mmol/L (>14 mg/dL).

ECG

Abnormal heart rhythms can also result, and ECG findings of a short QT interval suggest hypercalcaemia. Significant hypercalcaemia can cause ECG changes mimicking an acute myocardial infarction. Hypercalcaemia has also been known to cause an ECG finding mimicking hypothermia, known as an Osborn wave.

Treatments
The goal of therapy is to treat the hypercalcaemia first and subsequently effort is directed to treat the underlying cause.

Fluids and diuretics
Initial therapy:
 hydration, increasing salt intake, and forced diuresis.
 hydration is needed because many patients are dehydrated due to vomiting or kidney defects in concentrating urine.
 increased salt intake also can increase body fluid volume as well as increasing urine sodium excretion, which further increases urinary calcium excretion.
 after rehydration, a loop diuretic such as furosemide can be given to permit continued large volume intravenous salt and water replacement while minimizing the risk of blood volume overload and pulmonary oedema. In addition, loop diuretics tend to depress calcium reabsorption by the kidney thereby helping to lower blood calcium levels
 can usually decrease serum calcium by 1–3 mg/dL within 24 hours
 caution must be taken to prevent potassium or magnesium depletion

Bisphosphonates and calcitonin
Additional therapy:
 bisphosphonates are pyrophosphate analogues with high affinity for bone, especially areas of high bone-turnover.
 they are taken up by osteoclasts and inhibit osteoclastic bone resorption
 current available drugs include (in order of potency): (1st gen) etidronate, (2nd gen) tiludronate, IV pamidronate, alendronate (3rd gen) zoledronate and risedronate
 all people with cancer-associated hypercalcaemia should receive treatment with bisphosphonates since the 'first line' therapy (above) cannot be continued indefinitely nor is it without risk. Further, even if the 'first line' therapy has been effective, it is a virtual certainty that the hypercalcaemia will recur in the person with hypercalcaemia of malignancy. Use of bisphosphonates in such circumstances, then, becomes both therapeutic and preventative
 people in kidney failure and hypercalcaemia should have a risk-benefit analysis before being given bisphosphonates, since they are relatively contraindicated in kidney failure.
 Denosumab is a bone anti-resorptive agent that can be used to treat hypercalcemia in patients with a contraindication to bisphosphonates such as severe kidney failure or allergy.   
 Calcitonin blocks bone resorption and also increases urinary calcium excretion by inhibiting calcium reabsorption by the kidney
 Usually used in life-threatening hypercalcaemia along with rehydration, diuresis, and bisphosphonates
 Helps prevent recurrence of hypercalcaemia
 Dose is 4 international units per kilogram via subcutaneous or intramuscular route every 12 hours, usually not continued indefinitely due to quick onset of decreased response to calcitonin

Other therapies
 rarely used, or used in special circumstances
 plicamycin inhibits bone resorption (rarely used)
 gallium nitrate inhibits bone resorption and changes structure of bone crystals (rarely used)
 glucocorticoids increase urinary calcium excretion and decrease intestinal calcium absorption
 no effect on calcium level in normal or primary hyperparathyroidism
 effective in hypercalcaemia due to osteolytic malignancies (multiple myeloma, leukaemia, Hodgkin's lymphoma, carcinoma of the breast) due to antitumour properties
 also effective in hypervitaminosis D and sarcoidosis
 dialysis usually used in severe hypercalcaemia complicated by kidney failure. Supplemental phosphate should be monitored and added if necessary
 phosphate therapy can correct the hypophosphataemia in the face of hypercalcaemia and lower serum calcium

Other animals
Research has led to a better understanding of hypercalcemia in non-human animals. Often the causes of hypercalcemia have a correlation to the environment in which the organisms live. Hypercalcemia in house pets is typically due to disease, but other cases can be due to accidental ingestion of plants or chemicals in the home. Outdoor animals commonly develop hypercalcemia through vitamin D toxicity from wild plants within their environments.

Household pets
Household pets such as dogs and cats are found to develop hypercalcemia. It is less common in cats, and many feline cases are idiopathic. In dogs, lymphosarcoma, Addison’s disease, primary hyperparathyroidism, and chronic kidney failure are the main causes of hypercalcemia, but there are also environmental causes usually unique to indoor pets. Ingestion of small amounts of calcipotriene found in psoriasis cream can be fatal to a pet. Calcipotriene causes a rapid rise in calcium ion levels. Calcium ion levels can remain high for weeks if untreated and lead to an array of medical issues. There are also cases of hypercalcemia reported due to dogs ingesting rodenticides containing a chemical similar to calcipotriene found in psoriasis cream. Additionally, ingestion of household plants is a cause of hypercalcemia. Plants such as Cestrum diurnum, and Solanum malacoxylon contain ergocalciferol or cholecalciferol which cause the onset of hypercalcemia. Consuming small amounts of these plants can be fatal to pets. Observable symptoms may develop such as polydipsia, polyuria, extreme fatigue, or constipation.

Outdoor animals

In certain outdoor environments, animals such as horses, pigs, cattle, and sheep experience hypercalcemia commonly. In southern Brazil and Mattewara India, approximately 17 percent of sheep are affected, with 60 percent of these cases being fatal. Many cases are also documented in Argentina, Papua New Guinea, Jamaica, Hawaii, and Bavaria. These cases of hypercalcemeia are usually caused by ingesting Trisetum flavescens before it has dried out. Once Trisetum flavescens is dried out, the toxicity of it is diminished. Other plants causing hypercalcemia are Cestrum diurnum, Nierembergia veitchii, Solanum esuriale, Solanum torvum, and Solanum malacoxylon. These plants contain calcitriol or similar substances that cause rises in calcium ion levels. Hypercalcemia is most common in grazing lands at altitudes above 1500 meters where growth of plants like Trisetum flavescens is favorable. Even if small amounts are ingested over long periods of time, the prolonged high levels of calcium ions have large negative effects on the animals. The issues these animals experience are muscle weakness, and calcification of blood vessels, heart valves, liver, kidneys, and other soft tissues, which eventually can lead to death.

See also
 Calcium metabolism
 Dent's disease
 Electrolyte disturbance
 Disorders of calcium metabolism

References

External links 

Electrolyte disturbances
Calcium
Abnormal clinical and laboratory findings for blood
Wikipedia medicine articles ready to translate
Wikipedia neurology articles ready to translate
Medical mnemonics